Milia (meaning Apple tree) is a village in the Paphos District of Cyprus, located 2 km south of Fyti. 

Milia Paphou is one of the small villages of Cyprus, situated about 30 kilometers northeast of the homonymous capital of the province of Paphos, almost 100 kilometers northwest of Limassol and 160 kilometers southwest of Nicosia.

Not too far from Milia Paphou are also the settlements Drinia, Fyti and Lasa, while in the wider area there are several hotels and taverns.

Altitude 
Milia is located 637 m above sea level.

References

Communities in Paphos District